Margarita López Llull (born 3 December 1997) is a Spanish professional racing cyclist, who currently rides for UCI Women's Continental Team .

References

External links
 

1997 births
Living people
Spanish female cyclists
Sportspeople from Mallorca
Cyclists from the Balearic Islands